Southside School may refer to:
Southside School (Miami, Florida), listed on the NRHP in Florida
Southside School (Reno, Nevada), listed on the NRHP in Nevada